The women's rhythmic teams all-around gymnastics competition at the 2018 Commonwealth Games in Gold Coast, Australia was held on 11 April 2018 at the Coomera Indoor Sports Centre.

This event also determined the qualification standings for the individual all-around and apparatus finals.

Final
The final results:

References

Gymnastics at the 2018 Commonwealth Games
2018 in women's gymnastics